New Values is the third studio album by American musician Iggy Pop. It was released in July 1979 by record label Arista.

Background 

New Values was Pop's first record for Arista and the first collaboration by Pop and James Williamson since Kill City. The album also reunited Pop and Williamson with multi-instrumentalist Scott Thurston, who had played live piano for The Stooges on Metallic K.O. and Kill City.

Recording and release
Although guitar was played by Williamson on "Don't Look Down", Scott Thurston played guitar on all other tracks, with Williamson concentrating on production. Likewise, although one of the songs was written by Pop and Williamson, five tracks were collaborations between Pop and Thurston.

New Values was released in July 1979 by record label Arista. Although well-received critically, the album was not a commercial success, only reaching number 180 in the US Billboard 200 chart.

Videos were made for "I'm Bored" and "Five Foot One".

Critical reception 

New Values was well received by critics. Writing in NME at the time of the album's release, Paul Morley wrote that New Values "conclusively endorses Osterberg as thinker and Iggy as performer, and the relationship is positive and proud."

Charlotte Robinson of PopMatters wrote that the album's "delicate balancing act of tough with tender, rebellion with contentment, sincerity with humor, cocksure wailing with nuanced balladeering ... makes the album a winner".

Legacy 

David Bowie later covered "Don't Look Down" on his album Tonight (1984) and used it for the opening and closing titles of his short film Jazzin' for Blue Jean.

Pixies frontman Frank Black cited New Values as one of his favorite albums.

"The Endless Sea" was covered by the Australian psychedelic rock band The Church on their 1999 covers album A Box of Birds and Cat Power on her 2022 album Covers. It was also featured on the soundtrack of the 1986 film Dogs in Space, starring Michael Hutchence.

"Five Foot One" is played by Iggy in the Tales from the Crypt Season 4, Episode 8 episode entitled "For Cryin' Out Loud" during the charity rainforest concert.

Track listing

Personnel 
 Iggy Pop – vocals
 Scott Thurston – guitars, harp, keyboards, synthesizer, vocals, horn arrangement
 Klaus Krüger – drums
 Jackie Clark – bass
 John Harden – horns
 David Brock – strings, string arrangement
 Earl Shackelford – backing vocals
 The Alfono Sisters (Anna and Mary) – backing vocals on "Don't Look Down" and "Angel"
 James Williamson – guitar, horn and string arrangement, production, mixing

Technical
 Lloyd Malan – production assistance
 Peter Haden – engineering, mixing
 Paul Henry – sleeve design and art direction
 Trevor Rogers – sleeve photography
 Graphyk – sleeve graphics

Charts

References

External links 

 

1979 albums
Iggy Pop albums
Arista Records albums
Albums produced by James Williamson (musician)